Jan Zaor (Zaur, Zaorowicz) was a Polish baroque architect of Italian background from Kraków who lived in the 17th century and was active from 1638 to 1676. He is known for designing St. Peter and St. Paul's Church, Vilnius (1668–1676).

Works
He began designing in about 1638, when he worked on The Santa Casa (domek loretański) in Gołąb. He also designed and/or supervised the following buildings:

 The Parish Church of the Holy Trinity in Tarłów (mid-17th century)
 The Royal chapel in the church of Kazimierz Dolny (1653)
Pažaislis church (1672–1674)
St. Peter and St. Paul's Church, Vilnius (1668–1676)

References

17th-century births
17th-century deaths
Polish Baroque architects
Lithuanian Baroque architects
Architects from Kraków